Wenchang Subdistrict is a township-level division and the county seat of Jizhou District, Tianjin, China.

References

Township-level divisions of Tianjin